Johann Post (11 September 1902 Sauga Parish, Pärnu County – 1 February 1983 Tõstamaa Selsoviet, Pärnu District) was an Estonian politician. He was a member of Estonian National Assembly.

References

1902 births
1983 deaths
Members of the Estonian National Assembly